Columbia is a city mainly in Monroe County with a small portion in St. Clair County in the U.S. state of Illinois, about  south of St. Louis, Missouri. The population was 10,999 at the 2020 census.

History 
Columbia was first incorporated in 1859 as a small farming settlement, but had been occupied by various Native American cultures for 12,000 years. The earliest group encountered by European settlers were members of what became the Illinois Confederation, though they had moved to the area from the Great Lakes region only a few centuries before.

Geography
Columbia is located at  (38.449172, -90.208500).

Columbia is bounded on the west by the Mississippi River. Running in a diagonal line just northeast of Columbia is the border of St. Clair County, beyond which lies Dupo to the north and Millstadt to the east. To the south is Waterloo. Waterloo and Columbia are expected to grow right up to the borders of the other, in effect extending St. Louis's urban sprawl from South St. Louis County across the Jefferson Barracks Bridge into the heart of the formerly rural Monroe County.

Demographics

As of the census of 2010, there were 9,707 people. 3,792 households and 2,692 families reside in the city. The population density was 932.5 people per square mile. There were 3,977 housing units at an average density of 382 per square mile. The racial makeup of the city was 97.4% White, 0.4% African American, 0.1% Native American, 0.7% Asian, 0.6% from other races, and 0.9% from two or more races. Hispanic or Latino of any race were 2% of the population.

There were 3,792 households, out of which 32.9% had children under the age of 18 living with them, 59.1% were married couples living together, 8.6% had a female householder with no husband present, and 29.0% were non-families. 24.2% of all households were made up of individuals, and 10.9% had someone living alone who was 65 years of age or older. The average household size was 2.53 and the average family size was 3.03.

In the city, the age distribution of the population shows 25.0% under the age of 18, 5.3% from 20 to 24, 25.6% from 25 to 44, 27.9% from 45 to 64, and 14.3% who were 65 years of age or older. The median age was 39.6 years. For every 100 females, there were 94.4 males. For every 100 females age 18 and over, there were 89.7 males.

The median income for a household in the city was $67,333 and the median income for a family was $90,486. Males had a median income of $59,396 versus $43,594 for females. The per capita income for the city was $32,243. About 2.3% of families and 4.7% of the population were below the poverty line, including 1.7% of those under age 18 and 3.4% of those age 65 or over.

Education
Columbia is served by the public K-12 school district Columbia Community Unit District #4. District #4 includes Eagleview Elementary School (pre-k – 1), Parkview Elementary School (2-4), Columbia Middle School (5-8), and Columbia High School. Also located in the city is Immaculate Conception School, a private Roman Catholic grade school with grades from Pre-k to eighth.

Transportation

Highways
To get to places in other towns and cities, Columbians rely mostly on the four highways located nearby.
Illinois Route 3 is the only highway that runs through the city. It connects Columbia with Dupo and Cahokia in the northwest and Waterloo and Red Bud from the southeast. Illinois Route 158 has its western terminus just south of the city off of Route 3 and connects Columbia with Millstadt.

Interstate 255 and U.S. Route 50 overlap in St. Louis and continue over the Jefferson Barracks Bridge to Columbia, where they overlap again with Route 3 in an area just north of the city.

Airport
There is a small airport, Sackman Field, on the western edge of town, named for the former Columbia schools Music Director, Uhl Sackman.

Public transportation
A public bus service, provided by MetroBus, arrives in the morning and evening in Columbia and Waterloo and transports people to the MetroLink station in East St. Louis.

Climate

The climate in this area is characterized by hot, humid summers and generally cool winters.  According to the Köppen Climate Classification system, Columbia, IL has a humid subtropical climate, abbreviated "Cfa" on climate maps.

Notable people 

 Josh Fleming, pitcher for the Tampa Bay Rays
 Nelson Mathews, outfielder for the Chicago Cubs and Kansas City Athletics
 T. J. Mathews, pitcher for the St. Louis Cardinals and Oakland Athletics and Houston Astros
 John P. Weinel, United States Navy Admiral

See also
 USS Columbia (SSN-771)

References

Further reading
"Combined History of Randolph, Monroe and Perry Counties, Illinois: With Illustrations Descriptive of Their Scenery and Biographical Sketches of Some of Their Prominent Men and Pioneers."  Higginson Book Company, 1883. (Google Ebook)

External links

City of Columbia, Illinois

 
Metro East
Cities in Illinois
Cities in Monroe County, Illinois
Cities in St. Clair County, Illinois
Populated places established in 1859
Illinois populated places on the Mississippi River
1859 establishments in Illinois